Kenneth Bernard Beard FRCO(CHM) (9 June 1927, in Royton, Lancashire – 9 July 2010) was an English Cathedral Organist.

Education

He attended Kingswood School, Bath, and studied at the University of Manchester and the Royal Manchester College of Music from 1946 to 1949.

After Manchester, he was organ scholar of Emmanuel College, Cambridge,

He was also made a Fellow of the Royal College of Organists in 1949, and gained a Choirmaster diploma in 1954.

Career

He was: 
Organist of St. Michael's College, Tenbury 1952–1959
Rector Chori of Southwell Minster 1959–1988
Organist of St Mary's Church, Mold

During his time in Tenbury, he commissioned the anthem “Antiphon” from Benjamin Britten and conducted the first performance on 29 September 1956 in the presence of the composer.

At Southwell he was not only the organist of the Minster, but also head of Music of Southwell Minster School.

He was awarded the Cross of St Augustine by Rowan Williams, Archbishop of Canterbury, in 2008 in recognition of his service to church music.

References

Cathedral organists
1927 births
2010 deaths
People from Royton
People educated at Kingswood School, Bath
Alumni of the University of Manchester
Alumni of Emmanuel College, Cambridge
Recipients of the Cross of St Augustine
20th-century classical musicians